The David Shankle Group is a heavy metal band formed by former Manowar lead guitarist David Shankle.  Their debut album, "Ashes to Ashes", was released in June 2003. They released their second album, "Hellborn" on July 6, 2007.

Line-up
David Lee Shankle - Guitars
Warren Halvarson - Vocals
Michael Streicher - Bass
Gabriel Anthony - Drums

Former members
Steve Williams - Keyboards (2008–2009)
Trace Edward Zaber - Vocals (2001-2003)
Carlos Zema - Vocals (2008)
Dennis Hirschauer - Vocals (2006–2008)
Brad Sabathne - Drums (2006–2008)
Brian Gordon - Bass guitar (2001-2003)
Eddy Bethishou - Keyboards (2001-2003)
Eddie Foltz - Drums (2001-2003) 
Mike Dooley - Bass (2010-2012)

Discography

 Ashes to Ashes (2003)
 Hellborn (2007)
 Still A Warrior (2015)

External links
Official Website
Podcast: Interview with David Shankle

Musical groups established in 2002
Heavy metal musical groups from Illinois
2002 establishments in Illinois